The Disappearance of Nora is a 1993 thriller television film, starring Veronica Hamel and directed by Joyce Chopra.

Plot 

A beautiful woman is lost in the Las Vegas desert. She does not remember who she is or how she got there, so the manager of a casino makes offers to help.

Cast 
 Veronica Hamel as Nora Freemont 
 Stephen Collins as Jack Fremont 
 Dennis Farina as Denton 
 Leon Russom as Maxwell 
 Stan Ivar as Leland Sinclair  
 David Steen as Ernie 
 Jim J. Poslof as Eddie 
 Alyson Reed as Phyllis
 David Boyce as Truck Driver

References 
New York Magazine (8 March 1993)

External links 
 
 

1993 films
1993 television films
1990s thriller films
CBS network films
Films scored by Mark Snow
Films about amnesia
Films directed by Joyce Chopra
Films set in the Las Vegas Valley
American thriller television films
1990s English-language films
1990s American films